Marc van der Woude (born 1960) is a Dutch jurist, and a judge at the General Court of the European Union. He studied law at the University of Groningen and the College of Europe (1983-1984 promotion). He also lectured at the College of Europe and Leiden University. He worked as an attorney in Brussels from 1995, and became professor at the Erasmus University Rotterdam. He was appointed a judge in 2010.

References

1960 births
Living people
University of Groningen alumni
College of Europe alumni
Dutch jurists
Academic staff of the College of Europe
Academic staff of Leiden University
Academic staff of Erasmus University Rotterdam
General Court (European Union) judges
Dutch judges of international courts and tribunals
Dutch officials of the European Union